The following highways are numbered 322:

Canada
 Nova Scotia Route 322
 Saskatchewan Highway 322

China
 China National Highway 322

Costa Rica
 National Route 322

India
 National Highway 322 (India)

Japan
 Japan National Route 322

United States
  U.S. Route 322
  Arkansas Highway 322
  Connecticut Route 322
  County Road 322 (Levy County, Florida)
  Georgia State Route 322 (former)
  Iowa Highway 322 (former)
  Kentucky Route 322
  Louisiana Highway 322
  Maryland Route 322
  Minnesota State Highway 322 (former)
  Mississippi Highway 322
  Montana Secondary Highway 322
  Nevada State Route 322
  New Mexico State Road 322
 New York:
  New York State Route 322
  County Route 322 (Erie County, New York)
  South Carolina Highway 322
  Tennessee State Route 322
 Texas:
  Texas State Highway 322
  Texas State Highway Loop 322
  Farm to Market Road 322
  Virginia State Route 322
 Virginia State Route 322 (former)
  Wyoming Highway 322 (former)

Other areas:
  Puerto Rico Highway 322
  U.S. Virgin Islands Highway 322